The 1980 Georgia Bulldogs football team represented the Georgia Bulldogs of the University of Georgia during the 1980 NCAA Division I-A football season. The Bulldogs completed the season with a 12–0 record.  The Bulldogs had a regular season Southeastern Conference (SEC) record of 6–0. The Bulldogs completed their season with a 17–10 victory over Notre Dame in the Sugar Bowl.

The team was named national champion by NCAA-designated major selectors of Associated Press, Berryman, Billingsley, Football News, Football Writers, Helms, National Championship Foundation, National Football Foundation, Poling System, Sporting News, and UPI (coaches), while co-champion by Rothman and Sagarin (ELO-Chess), resulting in a consensus national champion designation.

Before the season
Herschel Walker, a 6-1, 218-pound running back, and the most sought after high school football player in the nation, signed a national letter of intent to play for the University of Georgia Bulldogs on Easter Sunday, April 6, 1980.

Schedule

Roster

Season summary

Tennessee
The season began with junior Donnie McMickens starting ahead of Walker at tailback as the Bulldogs faced the University of Tennessee on September 6 in Knoxville. With Tennessee gaining a 9–0 lead early in the 2nd quarter, coach Dooley told his offensive coordinator, "I'm putting Herschel in...Don't be afraid to let him carry the ball."

Tennessee held a 15–2 advantage late in the third quarter when Walker changed the momentum of the game. Late in the third quarter, Walker scored on a pitch sweep from 16 yards out, where he ran over Tennessee's safety and future Dallas Cowboys teammate, Bill Bates, near the goal line. Walker scored again five minutes later on a 9-yard touchdown run as Georgia went on to win the game, 16–15.

Texas A&M
A week later, Georgia hosted Texas A&M as the Bulldogs got off to a 28–0 lead by halftime. With four minutes left in the third quarter, Walker broke off a 76-yard TD run. He finished with 21 carries for 145 yards and 3 touchdowns against the Aggies. Quarterback Buck Belue complemented Walker's ground game by going 6 of 13 for 147 passing yards during the contest.

Clemson
In the games that followed, Georgia raced to a 6–0 start by knocking off Clemson (20–16), TCU (34–3), Ole Miss (28–21), and Vanderbilt (41–0). Walker ran for 121 yards against Clemson and 69 more versus TCU—including a 41-yard run. Georgia's 20-16 win over Clemson was even closer than the score indicated, as the Tigers held Georgia to just 155 total yards, of offense which was just 34 more than Walker's rush total. Walker needed help from senior CB/PR Scott Woerner to get past defensive-minded Clemson as the return man delivered with a 67-yard punt return for a score early in the first quarter as the Bulldogs would go on to win a close one.

Ole Miss
Walker missed much of the Ole Miss game with an injury.

Vanderbilt
In the Vandy game on October 18, Walker had 23 rushes for a career-high 283 yards, scoring on long touchdown runs of 60, 48, and 53 yards.

South Carolina
The special teams and defense gave Georgia the upper hand in the two weekends that followed and helped the Bulldogs get past Kentucky (27–0) and South Carolina (13–10). The win in Athens, Georgia over the Gamecocks on November 1 featured Walker matching up with the 1980 Heisman Trophy winner, George Rogers. Georgia got out to a 13–0 lead early in the third quarter and held on to win by 3 points. Walker's 76-yard touchdown run gave Georgia a commanding lead at 10–0 with early in the 3rd quarter. Walker rushed 43 times for 219 yards.

Florida

Georgia had made it to 8–0 when coach Dooley's Bulldogs faced the most daunting task of the year. The game would be affectionately referred to as the "Miracle on Duval Street" as second-ranked Georgia faced a 6–1 Florida Gators team in Jacksonville on November 8. Walker started things off by taking a toss sweep play to the right for 72 yards and a score early in the first quarter. Walker carried Georgia's offense that afternoon by rushing 37 times for 238 yards against the Gators. Georgia extended its lead to 20–10 late in the 3rd quarter when Florida began to mount its comeback. Florida QB Wayne Peace directed two scoring drives that gave the Gators a 21–20 lead late. With time running out on 3rd-and-11, QB Buck Belue found WR Lindsay Scott for a 93-yard touchdown pass to give Georgia the win, 26–21.

Auburn
Georgia clinched the SEC Championship on November 15 by taking out Auburn on the road, 31–21. Walker did most of the work by rushing 27 times for 84 yards, including an 18-yard touchdown.

Georgia Tech
Two weeks later, Walker ended the regular season with an exclamation point by scoring on touchdown runs of 1, 23, and 65 yards as Georgia defeated in-state rival Georgia Tech, 38–20. Walker rushed 25 times for 205 yards against the Ramblin' Wreck.

Postseason

Notre Dame
The Bulldogs were ranked No. 1 at 11–0 as they were invited to play a traditional football power, coach Dan Devine's Notre Dame Fighting Irish (9–1–1), in the Sugar Bowl in New Orleans, La. on January 1, 1981. With the score tied 3–3, Walker took center stage after Notre Dame failed to properly field a kickoff. Two plays later, Walker dove over the top for a 1-yard touchdown run to give UGA a 10–3 lead. He took advantage of more Irish misfortune as a Notre Dame fumble set Georgia up at the Irish 22-yard line. Three plays later, Walker was in the end zone again for a 17–3 lead. Georgia held on to win, 17–10. Walker, who suffered a dislocated left shoulder very early in the game, managed to rush 36 times for 150 yards, including a longest run of 23 yards.

At the season's conclusion, Walker helped his Georgia Bulldogs complete a 12–0 record as the Associated Press voted the University of Georgia No. 1 with 58½ first place votes to Pittsburgh's 3½. Walker and his teammates were also voted No. 1 by the United Press International Poll—which listed Georgia with 36 first place votes to Pitt's 3.

This would be Georgia's last National Championship until 2021, when the Bulldogs defeated the Alabama Crimson Tide 33-18 in the 2022 College Football Playoff National Championship game.

Notes

References

Georgia
Georgia Bulldogs football seasons
College football national champions
Southeastern Conference football champion seasons
Sugar Bowl champion seasons
College football undefeated seasons
Georgia Bulldogs football